Central Única dos Trabalhadores, commonly known by the acronym CUT, is the main national trade union center in Brazil.

History
CUT was formed on 28 August 1983 in São Bernardo do Campo, São Paulo, during the First National Congress of the Working Class. Alongside the Workers' Party (PT) and the Landless Workers' Movement (MST), CUT was one of the key organizations to challenge the military rule of 1964–1985 during its final stages, organizing strikes in automobile factories located in the ABC Region.

Nowadays, CUT is the largest and most important trade union federation in Brazil, representing over 7.4 million workers in all productive areas. It is also the largest trade union center in Latin America and the fifth largest in the world. Nevertheless, it continues to face obstacles because of corporatist laws that curb the workers' rights to organize. CUT generally supports a democratic socialist political ideology and is close to PT and its leaders, many of which had been union leaders in the past.

CUT was organized to oppose the so-called "old labour movement", associated with the late President Getúlio Vargas and his Brazilian Labour Party (PTB). The main practice of varguismo and its leaders was to try to integrate trade unions and the Ministry of Labor, once the President had based his policy for the area using the Carta del Lavoro of Fascist Italy as a role model. CUT arose as an alternative to this model, claiming to be part of the "new labour movement", independent from the federal government. However, its close ties with PT made CUT a source of criticism after Luiz Inácio Lula da Silva, PT's most prominent member, took office as President.

In March 2004, some union leaders unsatisfied with the organization's close ties with the Lula administration split from CUT in order to form the Coordenação Nacional de Lutas (Conlutas). Conlutas represents between 30 and 40 percent of the CUT leadership, and it is closer to the United Socialist Workers' Party (PSTU) and the Socialism and Liberty Party (PSOL) – dissidences of PT themselves – than PT. The following year, leaders tied to PSOL and the Brazilian Communist Party (PCB) formed the Instrumento de Luta e Organização da Classe Trabalhadora (Intersindical) and, in 2007, leaders linked to the Communist Party of Brazil (PCdoB) formed the Central dos Trabalhadores e Trabalhadoras do Brasil (CTB).

Affiliates
The following federations are affiliated to CUT:

Leadership

Presidents
1983: Jair Meneguelli
1994: Vicente Paulo da Silva
2000: João Felicio
2003: Luiz Marinho
2005: João Felicio
2006: Artur Henrique da Silva Santos
2012: Vagner Freitas
2019: Sérgio Nobre

General Secretaries
1983: Paulo Paim
Gilmar Carneiro
1997: João Antonio Felicio
2000: Carlos Alberto Grana
2003: João Antonio Felicio
2005: Artur Henrique da Silva Santos
2006: Quintino Severo
2012: Sérgio Nobre
2019: Carmen Foro

See also

Confederação Geral dos Trabalhadores
Força Sindical

References

Sources

External links
 Official website 

Trade unions in Brazil
International Trade Union Confederation
Brazil
Trade unions established in 1983
Organisations based in São Paulo
Progressive International